Tochigi Prefectural South Gymnasium is an arena in Oyama, Tochigi, Japan.

References
The Tochigi Prefectural South Gymnasium provides a variety of equipment that aid health, physical training or culture activities .This gymnasium of the prefecture opened as core physical education facility of the prefectural south area that met new sports needs of in July, 1993. It is a facility capable of holding international meeting and national convention and greatly contributes to promotion and the prefecture sports of prefectural total sports and improvement of competition too.

Basketball venues in Japan
Indoor arenas in Japan
Utsunomiya Brex
Sports venues in Tochigi Prefecture